Julio Osorio (2 October 1939 – 28 September 2022) was a Panamanian basketball player who competed in the 1968 Summer Olympics.

On 28 September 2022, Osorio died in Panama City, at the age of 82.

References

External links

1939 births
2022 deaths
Sportspeople from Panama City
Panamanian men's basketball players
1970 FIBA World Championship players
Olympic basketball players of Panama
Basketball players at the 1968 Summer Olympics
Basketball players at the 1967 Pan American Games
Pan American Games bronze medalists for Panama
Pan American Games medalists in basketball
Medalists at the 1967 Pan American Games